The River Valley Conference is a high school sports Conference in northeastern and two high schools in a southern suburbs is "Illinois Lutheran and Beecher High School in Illinois, United States. The conference is part of the Illinois High School Association. The conference started around 1940 as the Kankakee Valley Conference, making up schools from the Kankakee County and Will County area. The conference had split into two divisions (Kan-Will and Will-Ro-Kee) in 1953 to make football scheduling more manageable, but maintained the conference in basketball and other sports. With the Iroquois and Vermilion Valley conferences folding, the KVC took on some of their members, prompting the change to its current name. The biggest shift since then occurred in 2006, as its larger schools left to join schools with similar membership, leaving the RVC as a rural, smaller school conference. In 2020, Grace Christian became a full IHSA member, and joined the RVC. This brought the amount of teams up to 8. Momence and Clifton Central are set to join the RVC in 2021, due to the dissolving of the Sangamon Valley Conference. This will bring the conference up to 10 teams.

Membership

Current

Former
Note: records before 1948-49 are incomplete. Some teams may have played in the conference before the date recorded, other schools may have played in the conference's early years.

 Known as Crete until 1948.
 Known as Reddick until 1950.
 Known as St. Patrick until 1955.
 Herscher played concurrently in the KVC and VVC from 1950 to 1954.

See also
List of Illinois High School Association member conferences

References

External links

Illinois high school sports conferences